The Isle of Wight Garlic Festival is a fundraising event that is held annually on the Isle of Wight to support the island's garlic industry, as well as fundraising for other agricultural farms on the island.

History
The Garlic Festival has been held every year since 1983, except 2020-21 when officials cited the COVID-19 pandemic that caused its cancellation. 2022 saw its resumption. From 1985 to 2006, the Newchurch Parish Sports & Community Association organised the annual Garlic Festival, achieving their major fundraising goals. It has recently drawn 20,000 visitors a year.

Further entertainment has included live music from artists such as The Wurzels, Chas & Dave, Alvin Stardust, Glitter Band, Foundations, Chesney Hawkes, Kiki Dee, and Jim Diamond.

See also
 Gilroy Garlic Festival

References

External links
Isle of Wight Garlic Festival official website
Food and drink festivals in the United Kingdom
Tourist attractions on the Isle of Wight
Garlic
Festivals on the Isle of Wight
Annual events in England
1983 establishments in England
Festivals established in 1983